Avtandil (stylized as AVTANDIL) born Avtandil Tskvitinidze is a  Georgian fashion designer based in Tbilisi.

Avtandil graduated from Tbilisi State Academy of Arts in 1995.

His clothes are sold in US, Germany, France, UAE, Ukraine, Russia and Kazakhstan.

References

Businesspeople from Tbilisi
Living people
Fashion designers from Georgia (country)
Tbilisi State Academy of Arts alumni
Year of birth missing (living people)